Frank Brunner (born February 21, 1949) is an American comics artist and illustrator best known for his work at Marvel Comics in the 1970s.

Early life
Brunner attended Manhattan's High School of Art and Design. He was in the same graduating class as Larry Hama and Ralph Reese. He studied at the New York University Film School.

Career

Comics
Brunner entered the comics profession as a horror writer-artist for the black-and-white comics magazines Web of Horror, Creepy, Eerie, and Vampirella. His first work for Marvel Comics was inking an 11–page Watcher backup story in The Silver Surfer #6 (June 1969). Brunner's best-known color-comics work is his Marvel Comics collaboration with writer Steve Engelhart on the supernatural hero Doctor Strange in Marvel Premiere #9–14 (July 1973–March 1974) and in Doctor Strange: Master of the Mystic Arts #1–2 and #4–5 (June–August 1974 and Oct.–Dec. 1974). The two killed Dr. Strange's mentor, the Ancient One, and Strange became the new Sorcerer Supreme. Englehart and Brunner created a multi-issue storyline in which a sorcerer named Sise-Neg ("Genesis" spelled backward) goes back through history, collecting all magical energies, until he reaches the beginning of the universe, becomes all-powerful and creates it anew, leaving Strange to wonder whether this was, paradoxically, the original creation. Stan Lee, seeing the issue after publication, ordered Englehart and Brunner to print a retraction saying this was not God but a god, so as to avoid offending religious readers. The writer and artist concocted a fake letter from a fictitious minister praising the story, and mailed it to Marvel from Texas; Marvel unwittingly printed the letter, and dropped the retraction order. In 2010, Comics Bulletin ranked Englehart and Brunner's run on the "Doctor Strange" feature ninth on its list of the "Top 10 1970s Marvels".

Other Marvel credits include Howard the Duck's first two solo stories in Giant-Size Man-Thing #4 and #5 (May and Aug. 1975) and the first two issues of the Howard the Duck comic book series (Jan. and March 1976), as well as the anthologies Chamber of Chills, Haunt of Horror, and Unknown Worlds of Science Fiction. He drew covers for the supernatural series The Tomb of Dracula and the swamp-monster series Man-Thing.

Also for Marvel, Brunner adapted Robert E. Howard's sword-and-sorcery pulp fiction hero Conan the Barbarian in the 42-page story "The Scarlet Citadel", and drew many covers for the similar series Red Sonja and Savage Sword of Conan. Brunner left Marvel in 1979 and wrote an essay in The Comics Journal stating that he "felt the romance with comics was over".

Brunner and novelist Michael Moorcock collaborated on a comics adaptation of Moorcock's sword-and-sorcery hero Elric in Heavy Metal magazine. It was reprinted in publisher Mike Friedrich's Star Reach Greatest Hits.

Brunner briefly returned to comics in the early-1980s as artist on the First Comics title Warp!, based on the science fiction play that ran briefly on Broadway in the 1970s. He then wrote and drew the graphic novel The Seven Samuroid (1984), a science-fiction takeoff of the movie classic Seven Samurai.

Film and television
Brunner moved to Hollywood and began a career in movie and television animation, working on projects for Hanna-Barbera (Jonny Quest), Walt Disney Imagineering (Euro Tomorrowland movie), Warner Bros. (preproduction Batman design) and DreamWorks (Invasion USA). He was the head of character design for the Fox animated series X-Men.

Bibliography

Books 
The Brunner Mystique (Artist Index Series Volume One) (Hendrik Sharples and Steven R. Johnson, March 1976)
Brunner's Beauties (Eros Comix, August 1993)
Eyes Of Light: the Fantasy Art of Frank Brunner (Vanguard Productions, 2002)
Mythos: The Fantasy Realms of Frank Brunner (Vanguard Productions, 2007)

Comics and magazines
Interior art (except where noted) includes:

First Comics
Warp! #1–9 (1983)

Marvel Comics

Chamber of Chills #2–4 (1973)
Doctor Strange #1–5 (also covers) (1974) 
Giant-Size Man-Thing # 4–5 (1975) (first two Howard the Duck solo appearances)
Howard the Duck #1–2 (also covers) (1976)
Marvel Premiere (Doctor Strange feature) #4 (inker); #6, 9–14 (1972–1974)
Monsters Unleashed #2 (1973)
Mystic Hands of Dr. Strange #1 (2010)
Savage Sword of Conan #30 (1978)
Silver Surfer #6 (inker) (1969)
Unknown Worlds of Science Fiction #1 (1975)

Pacific Comics
 Alien Worlds #6 (cover and interior art) (1984)

Star Reach
Quack #1, 6 (1976–1977)
Star Reach #3 (also painted cover); #10, 12 (covers only) (1974–1977)

Warren Publishing
Creepy #39, 45 (1971–1972)
Eerie #35 (1971)
Vampirella #10 (1971)

Other publishers

Adventures of Chrissie Claus #31 (cover)
Brunner's Carnal Delights #1 (cover) (Carnal)
Castle of Frankenstein (Kable News)
Crawdaddy!
Flare #29 (cover) (Hero)
Flare Adventures #13, 15-19 (covers) (Hero)
Monster Times
Red Sonja #2 (cover) (Dynamite Entertainment)
Unknown Worlds of Frank Brunner (cover) (Eclipse Comics)
Silver Comics #1, 4, 6 (covers) (Silver)
Karmatron #20 (cover and interior art, 1987) (Cepsa)
The War of the Worlds (covers) (Best Sellers Illustrated)
Witchgirls Inc. #1-3, 5 (covers)
Wild Stars #1-6 (covers) (Little Rocket)

Art portfolios
Flesh & Fantasy Bran Mak Morn
Elric
Alice in Wonderland
Through the Looking-Glass (Alice II)
Stormbringer (Elric II)
Flesh & Fantasy II
Legends of Arzack

Trading cards (Topps)
Jurassic Park
Star Wars Galaxy
Vampirella
Mars Attacks
Satan's Six

Film

Live-action
Cellar Dweller
From Time To Time (Disney)
Dr. Strange (CBS)
Dinosaur Valley Girls

Animation

The Real Adventures of Jonny Quest
Sky Commanders
Dark Water
Dino-Riders
Once Upon a Forest (feature)
X-Men (1992–1995)
Darkstalkers
Skeleton Warriors
Extreme Ghostbusters

Record-album covers
Faithful Breath
Mandator
Necronomicon (German heavy metal bands)
Veto (Danish heavy metal band)

Poster prints
The Faerie Princess (Dreamweaver Studios)
Four Queens Of The Tarot (Color)
Dreamtide (Dreamweaver)
Go Ask Alice (Dreamweaver)
Raiders Of The Lost Egg (Vanguard)

Further reading
"Brunner Mystique", interview: Spectrum Magazine #3
Star*Reach information referenced from Comic Book Artist #2

References

External links

Frank Brunner at Mike's Amazing World of Comics
Frank Brunner at the Unofficial Handbook of Marvel Comics Creators

1949 births
20th-century American artists
21st-century American artists
Album-cover and concert-poster artists
American animators
American comics artists
American illustrators
American speculative fiction artists
Fantasy artists
High School of Art and Design alumni
Inkpot Award winners
Living people
Marvel Comics people
Pin-up artists
Role-playing game artists
Science fiction artists
Tisch School of the Arts alumni